Tales from the Aniverse is a science fiction comic book created by Randy Zimmerman and Susan Van Camp, first published in 1985 by Arrow Comics, featuring anthropomorphic animals as the main characters.

Overview
Tales From The Aniverse was a collection of stories featuring a group of characters in a futuristic animal universe and had such characters as J.B. Space (galactic courier), Miss Chevious (bounty hunter), Falterous (space pirate lord) and Drakestar (maniac ruler of the Avian empire), P'Jonn, and others.

Arrow Comics published Tales from the Aniverse for six issues. Zimmerman restarted the series on Wee Bee Comics in 1987, but it was canceled after its second issue. Massive Comics published three new issues under the original name.

In 1996, Arrow Comics was revitalized a third time and one of the Aniverse's characters, Miss Chevious, was given a mini-series written and drawn by Steph Graves. This lasted two issues. Zimmerman later revived the Miss Chevious character in Flint Comix & Entertainment in 2009.

References

External links
 Arrow Comics official website

1985 comics debuts
Science fiction comics
Anthropomorphic animal characters